The Battle of Dubienka occurred during the Polish–Russian War of 1792 (War of the Second Partition of Poland) where on July 18, 1792, the Polish army under the command of General Tadeusz Kościuszko defended the Bug River crossing against the Russian army under General Michail Kachovski. Although the Russians had a numerical advantage of 5:1 over the Polish defenders, their attacks were stymied by field fortifications raised by the Poles, leading to a Polish tactical victory. Subsequent Russian flanking forced the Poles to retreat to avoid being encircled. After the Polish-Lithuanian forces left their forward positions, the Russian army occupied the area.

Background
When the Russian army invaded Poland in May 1792, they had a nearly 3:1 numerical advantage, forcing the Polish forces to retreat. General Tadeusz Kościuszko has been tasked with commanding the rear guard and delaying the Russian advance. The Bug river was the last natural obstacle before the Russian army and the Polish capital of Warsaw, about 250 km away. Kościuszko had been tasked by the Polish commander-in-chief, Prince Józef Poniatowski, with stopping a much larger Russian army attempting to cross the river near the village of Dubienka.

Opposing forces
Kościuszko had about 5,300 forces under his command, while Russian general Michail Kachovski had about 25,000. Kachovski had also an advantage with artillery, commanding 56 cannons to Kościuszko's fewer than 10 pieces.

Battle
Kościuszko, an experienced engineer who had only recently designed the fortifications of West Point in the United States, had to secure the Bug at about 50 km of its length, on one end touching the Austrian border. He chose an advantageous position, protected by dense forests and swamps, and ordered construction of field fortifications, underwater traps, as well as burning of a nearby bridge.

Around 15:00 on 18 July the Russians reached the river and attempted to cross it in small boats near the burned bridge, while another part of their forces crossed in the north. The initial Russian attack got bogged down in difficult terrain, and they took heavy casualties from the Polish artillery, while their own was less effective shelling the Polish fortified positions. A Russian cavalry unit made it to the Polish artillery emplacements but was pushed back, and their commanding colonel Palembach was killed. After five hours of repeated assaults, the Russians retreated, leaving about 4,000 dead. The Poles took about 900 casualties, mostly from the Russian artillery fire.

After nightfall, Polish scouts reported Russians crossing to the south, through neutral Austrian territory. As the Poles were running low on supplies, Kościuszko decided that his army could not withstand a prolonged siege, and ordered a retreat towards Chełm to avoid being encircled.

Aftermath
While Kościuszko was criticized for retreating by some officers, he was rewarded by king Stanisław August Poniatowski with a Virtuti Militari order. He was also praised by his opponent, General Michail Kachovski, who in his official report noted that this was the most difficult battle of the campaign so far. One week after this battle Poland capitulated.

References

Further reading
Sułek Zdzisław, Bitwa pod Dubienką 18 lipca 1792 r., „Studia i materiały do historii wojskowości" 1960, t. 6, cz. 1, s. 119-21
Sułek Zdzisław, Bitwa pod Dubienką 18 lipca 1792 r. w: Powstanie niespełnionych nadziei 1863, Kraków 1984 (seria "Arsenał Polski")

External links
 Przebieg bitwy pod Dubienką, Ks. Henryk Krukowski - TK Niedziela

Conflicts in 1792
Battles of the Polish–Russian War of 1792